Sauris is a genus of moths in the family Geometridae erected by Achille Guenée in 1857.

Description
Palpi porrect (extending forward), usually about three times the length of head, the second joint fringed with hair above. Antennae of male very much thickened and flattened. Hind tibia of male lack spurs, of female with one spur pair. Abdomen very long. Forewings very ample. Vein 3 from before angle of cell. Vein 5 from middle of discocellulars. Vein 6 from upper angle and veins 10 and 11 stalked, whereas vein 10 anastomosing (fusing) with veins 8 and 9 to form the areole. Hindwings of female with vein 2 from near angle of cell. Veins 3 and 4 stalked or from angle. Vein 5 from middle of discocellulars and veins 6 and 7 stalked. Vein 8 anastomosing with vein 7 to near angle of cell.

Species
Sauris angustifasciata Inoue – Taiwan, Hong Kong
Sauris auricula (Warren, 1895) – Malaysia
Sauris brevipalpis Dugdale, 1980 – Australia
Sauris cirrhigera (Warren, 1897) – Australia
Sauris commoni Dugdale, 1980 – Australia
Sauris dentatilinea (Warren, 1905) – Australia
Sauris hirudinata Guenée, 1857 – Sri Lanka, Malaysia, Borneo 
Sauris ignobilis Butler – Hong Kong
Sauris imbecilla (Swinhoe, 1902) – New Guinea
Sauris infirma Swinhoe, 1902 – Borneo
Sauris interruptata Moore – Hong Kong
Sauris lichenias (Meyrick, 1891) – Australia
Sauris lineosa Moore, 1888 – India, Sri Lanka
Sauris malaca (Meyrick, 1891) – Australia
Sauris melanoceros (Meyrick, 1889) – Australia
Sauris melanosterna Dugdale, 1980 – Australia
Sauris nebulosa Dugdale, 1980 – Australia
Sauris nigripalpata Walker, 1862 – Sri Lanka
Sauris perfasciata Hampson, 1895 – Sri Lanka
Sauris plumipes Dugdale, 1980 – Australia
Sauris proboscidaria Walker, 1862 – Ceylon 
Sauris purpuroticta Galsworthy, 1999 – Hong Kong
Sauris rectilineata Dugdale, 1980 – Australia
Sauris usta (Warren, 1895) – Malaysia
Sauris vetustata Walker, 1866 – Australia
Sauris victoriae Galsworthy, 1999 – Hong Kong

References

The male of Sauris mouliniei, an endemic Seychelles moth

 
Trichopterygini